Kirkgate is an ancient thoroughfare in Leith, Edinburgh, Scotland. It runs north from the foot of Leith Walk towards Leith Docks. It is one of the oldest streets in the district and historically one of its most vital road links.

Most of the buildings on old Kirkgate and neighbouring streets such as Tolbooth Wynd were demolished in the 1960s and replaced by the Newkirkgate Shopping Centre and a new housing complex, which incorporates the A-listed tower block Linksview House, in 1965. The resident population were mainly dispersed to new housing developments elsewhere in Edinburgh.

Etymology
The street name is of Old Norse origin, and is identical in meaning with "Church Street". The church it refers to is probably South Leith Parish Church.

Notable buildings and landmarks

Gaiety Theatre, Leith
Trinity House of Leith
Leith Hospital
South Leith Parish Church
Linksview House

Notable residents

Lord Balmerino
Robert Andrew Macfie, businessman and Member of Parliament
William Merrilees, policeman

References

Bibliography

Streets in Edinburgh
Leith
Odonyms referring to a building
Odonyms referring to religion